The 2010 Skate Canada International was the second event of six in the 2010–11 ISU Grand Prix of Figure Skating, a senior-level international invitational competition series. It was held at the K-Rock Centre in Kingston, Ontario on October 28–31. Medals were awarded in the disciplines of men's singles, ladies' singles, pair skating, and ice dancing. Skaters earned points toward qualifying for the 2010–11 Grand Prix Final.

Schedule
 October 28 - Practice sessions
 October 29 - Ladies' short, Pairs short, Men's short, Short dance
 October 30 - Pairs' free, Men's free, Ladies' free
 October 31 - Free dance, Exhibition

Results

Men

Ladies

Pairs

Ice dancing

References

External links
 
 Skate Canada
 ISU entries/results page
 Toronto Sun
 
 
 
 
 

Skate Canada International, 2010
Skate Canada International
Skate Canada International
Skate Canada International
Skate Canada International